Clifford Lyman Livingston (July 2, 1930 – March 13, 2010) was an American professional football player who was a linebacker in the National Football League (NFL) for the New York Giants, the Minnesota Vikings and the Los Angeles Rams. He was born in Compton, California and played college football at UCLA.

In 1965 while with the Rams, he and several of his teammates appeared in cameo roles in the Perry Mason episode, "The Case of the 12th Wildcat."

He died at his home in the affluent neighborhood of Southern Highlands in Las Vegas, Nevada on March 13, 2010.

His brother Howie Livingston (1922–1994) also played in the NFL.

Notes

External links
 

1930 births
2010 deaths
American football linebackers
UCLA Bruins football players
University of California, Los Angeles alumni
New York Giants players
Minnesota Vikings players
Los Angeles Rams players